Max-interacting transcriptional repressor MAD4 is a protein that in humans is encoded by the MXD4 gene.

Function 

This gene is a member of the MAD gene family . The MAD genes encode basic helix-loop-helix-leucine zipper proteins that heterodimerize with MAX protein, forming a transcriptional repression complex. The MAD proteins compete for MAX binding with MYC, which heterodimerizes with MAX forming a transcriptional activation complex. Studies in rodents suggest that the MAD genes are tumor suppressors and contribute to the regulation of cell growth in differentiating tissues.

References

Further reading

External links 
 

Transcription factors